Bhargava Markandeya is an ancient rishi (sage) born in the clan of Bhrigu Rishi (Bhargava Brahmins Community). The Markandeya Purana especially, comprises a dialogue between Markandeya and a sage called Jaimini, and a number of chapters in the Bhagavata Purana are dedicated to his conversations and prayers. He is also mentioned in the Mahabharata. Markandeya is venerated within all mainstream Hindu traditions.

Today, Markandeya Tirtha, where the sage Markandeya wrote the Markandeya Purana is situated on a trekking route to the Yamunotri Shrine in the Uttarkashi district, Uttarakhand.

Rescued by Kalantaka-Shiva

One legend relates the story of how Shiva protected Markandeya from the clutches of death, personified as Yama.

The great sage Mrikandu rishi and his wife Marudmati worshipped Shiva and sought from him the boon of begetting a son. As a result, he was given the choice of either a righteous son, but with a short life on earth or a child of low intelligence but with a long life. Mrikandu rishi chose the former, and was blessed with Markandeya, an exemplary son, destined to die at the age of 16.

Markandeya grew up to be a great devotee of Shiva and on the day of his destined death he continued his worship of Shiva in his aniconic form of Shivalingam. The messengers of Yama, the god of death were unable to take away his life because of his great devotion and continual worship of Shiva. Yama then came in person to take away Markandeya's life, and sprung his noose around the young sage's neck. By accident or fate the noose mistakenly landed around the Shivalingam, and out of it, Shiva emerged in all his fury attacking Yama for his act of aggression. After defeating Yama in battle to the point of death, Shiva then revived him, under the condition that the devout youth would live forever. For this act, Shiva was thereafter also known as Kalantaka ("Ender of Death").

This event, it is said, took place on the bank of river Gomati in Kaithi, Varanasi. An ancient temple Markandeya Mahadeva Temple is made on this site. It's the place where river Ganga and river Gomati merge so being a Sangam area, its sacredness increases. Alternatively, another story states that this event happened in Kerala, at the site of Triprangode Siva Temple where the Markandeya ran up to the Shiva Linga at the temple to escape from Yama. A source also claims that this incident took place at the Parli Vaijnath Jyotirlinga in Beed district of Maharashtra.

As sourced from Sati Purana, a secret portion of Markandeya Purana,  Goddess Parvati also gave him a boon to write a text on veera charitra (Brave character) on her, the text is famously known as Durga Saptashati, a valuable portion in Markandeya Purana.
The place is known as Yamkeshwar.

Eternal life
Another story which deals with Markandeya's long life gives an account of how he lived past the death of the previous world and watched it end through gaining knowledge from Lord Vishnu.

Bhagavata Purana

A tale from the Bhagavata Purana states that once sage Markandeya visited Narayana rishi and asked him for a boon. Markandeya prayed to the sage Narayana to show him his illusory power or Maya since sages Nara-Narayana are incarnation of Supreme Lord Narayana. To fulfill his wish, Lord Vishnu appeared in the form of a child floating on a leaf, and declared to the sage that he was Time and Death. Sage Markandeya entered into his mouth and saved himself from the surging water. Inside the boy's stomach Markandeya discovered all the worlds, the seven regions and the seven oceans. The mountains and the kingdoms were all there. So were all living beings. Markandeya did not know what to make of all this. He started to pray to Lord Vishnu. No sooner had he started, than he came out of the boy's mouth. Lord Vishnu now appeared before him and blessed him. The sage spent a thousand years with Lord Vishnu. He composed the Bala Mukundashtakam at this moment. He taught Bhishma duties of Yatis. When Bhishma was in the bed of arrows, Markandeya visited him along with other sages.

Markandeya Purana

The Devi Mahatmya section of the Markandeya Purana is one of the most important texts of Shakti tradition.

Films on Markandeya
  (1922)
Shri Markandeya Avtaar (1922)
Markandeya (1935)
 Bhakta Markandeya (1938)
 Bhakta Markandeya (1956)
Bhakta Dhruva Markandeya (1982)

See also
Narada
Prahlada
Four Kumaras
Hindu calendar
Saptarishi
Chiranjivins

References

Dictionary of Hindu Lore and Legend by Anna Dallapiccola
 The Complete Idiot's Guide to Hinduism, Chapter 1, pg 13

External links
The Markandeya Purana (English) by F. E. Pargiter; Online HTML
Markandeya's Prayers from the Bhagavata Purana
Markandeya Sastha Temple
Markandeya Temple Mumbai(Worli)
Markandeya obtained his boon of life here in Parali from Vaidyanatha

Rishis
Characters in the Mahabharata